Rosenallis Gaelic Athletic Association club is a hurling and Gaelic football  club in the village of Rosenallis in County Laois, Ireland.

The club colours are green and white. The club formerly amalgamated with the Clonaslee–St Manman's club to play senior hurling under the name Tinnahinch.

Seamus Dooley, Declan Conroy and John Lennon are three of the club's most famous players, representing Laois at senior hurling level.

Rosenallis has never won the Laois Senior Hurling Championship but has won the Laois Intermediate Hurling Championship three times (in 1989, 1999 and 2016).

In 2012, Rosenallis GAA had a huge representation at county level. Patrick Keating played for Laois U21 hurling while at minor level, Ruaidhri C-Fennell and Dean Mahon played with the county footballers and Ronan Murray, John Lennon and Eoin Carroll played for the county hurlers.

History
In the mid-1990s, Rosenallis won the Junior Football Championship and then went on to win the Intermediate Football Championship back-to-back.

In 2016, Rosenallis won a dual championship — junior football and intermediate hurling. Paddy Dunne was the manager.

Achievements
 Leinster Junior Club Football Championship Winners 2016
 Laois Intermediate Hurling Championship (3) 1989, 1999, 2016
 Laois Senior "A Hurling Championship: 2019
 Laois Junior Football Championships (2) 1994, 2016
 Laois Intermediate Football Championship (2) 1995, 2019

References
https://www.leinsterexpress.ie/news/gaa/481976/rosenallis-capture-intermediate-football-crown-over-12-man-clonaslee.html

External links
 Official Rosenallis GAA Club website
 https://www.leinsterexpress.ie/news/gaa/481976/rosenallis-capture-intermediate-football-crown-over-12-man-clonaslee.html
 https://www.laoistoday.ie/2019/09/30/never-say-die-attitude-to-the-fore-as-dunne-leads-rosenallis-to-intermediate-football-crown/
 https://www.laoistoday.ie/2019/09/29/in-pictures-rosenallis-and-odempseys-celebrate-intermediate-and-junior-football-success/
 https://www.laoistoday.ie/2019/09/28/14-man-rosenallis-see-off-12-man-clonaslee-to-claim-intermediate-glory/

 
Gaelic games clubs in County Laois
Gaelic football clubs in County Laois